Peraniana is a genus of moths of the family Noctuidae.

Species
 Peraniana dissociata (Barnes & McDunnough, 1910)

References
Natural History Museum Lepidoptera genus database
Peraniana at funet

Hadeninae